Khekaranalla Dam is an earthfill dam on KhekaraNalla river near Saoner, Nagpur district in state of Maharashtra in India.

Specifications
Irrigation is the purpose of the dam.

See also
 Dams in Maharashtra
 List of reservoirs and dams in India

References

Dams in Nagpur district
Dams completed in 1988
1988 establishments in Maharashtra